Primnoidae is a family of soft corals.

Genera
The World Register of Marine Species includes the following genera in the family:

Abyssoprimnoa Cairns, 2015
Acanthoprimnoa Cairns & Bayer, 2004
Aglaoprimnoa Bayer, 1996
Ainigmaptilon Dean, 1926
Armadillogorgia Bayer, 1980
Arntzia López-González, Gili & Orejas, 2002
Arthrogorgia Kükenthal, 1908
Australogorgia Cairns & Bayer, 2009
Callogorgia Gray, 1858
Callozostron Wright, 1885
Calyptrophora Gray, 1866
Canarya Ocaña & van Ofwegen, 2003
Candidella Bayer, 1954
Convexella Bayer, 1996
Dasystenella Versluys, 1906
Dicholaphis Kinoshita, 1907
Fanellia Gray, 1870
Fannyella Gray, 1872
Helicoprimnoa Cairns, 2012
Heptaprimnoa Cairns, 2012
Metafannyella Cairns & Bayer, 2009
Metanarella Cairns, 2012
Microprimnoa Bayer & Stefani, 1989
Mirostenella Bayer, 1988
Narella Gray, 1870
Narelloides Cairns, 2012
Onogorgia Cairns & Bayer, 2009
Ophidiogorgia Bayer, 1980
Paracalyptrophora Kinoshita, 1908
Paranarella Cairns, 2007
Parastenella Versluys, 1906
Perissogorgia Bayer & Stefani, 1989
Plumarella Gray, 1870
Primnoa Lamouroux, 1812
Primnocapsa Zapata-Guardiola & López-González, 2012
Primnoeides Studer & Wright, 1887
Primnoella Gray, 1858
Pseudoplumarella Kükenthal, 1915
Pterostenella Versluys, 1906
Pyrogorgia Cairns & Bayer, 2009
Scopaegorgia Zapata-Guardiola & Lopez-González, 2010
Tauroprimnoa Zapata-Guardiola & Lopez-González, 2010
Thouarella Gray, 1870
Tokoprymno Bayer, 1996

References

 
Calcaxonia
Cnidarian families